The 2021 Le Mans Cup, known as the 2021 Michelin Le Mans Cup under sponsorship, was the sixth season of the Le Mans Cup. It began on 17 April at the Circuit de Barcelona-Catalunya and ended on 25 October at the Algarve International Circuit. The series was open to Le Mans Prototypes in the LMP3 class, and grand tourer sports cars in the GT3 class.

Calendar
The 2021 calendar was unveiled on 19 October 2020.

Calendar changes
Barcelona returned for 2021 after being cancelled due to the COVID-19 pandemic.

Entries

LMP3
All cars in the LMP3 class used the Nissan VK56DE 5.6L V8 engine and Michelin tyres.

Innovative car

GT3

Race results
Bold indicates the overall winner.

Standings
Points are awarded according to the following structure:

LMP3 Teams Championship

GT3 Teams Championship

LMP3 Drivers Championship

GT3 Drivers Championship

References

External links
 

2021 in motorsport
2021 in European sport